The Armenian Ambassador to China is the head of diplomatic mission of Armenia in People's Republic of China.

Armenian-Chinese official talks started, when the People’s Republic of China officially recognized Armenia on December 27, 1991. Diplomatic relations between Armenia and the People’s Republic of China were established on April 6, 1992.

Embassy was opened in Beijing on October 10, 1996.

List of Envoys to the Republic of China

Charge d’Affairs of Armenia

Armenian Embassy in China also covers Singapore, Vietnam and South Korea.

See also
 Foreign relations of Armenia

References
Website of Embassy of Armenia to China

 
Armenia
China